Muriel  is a feminine given name in the English language.

Origin/history
The name is of Goidelic origin and was originally spelled as Muirgheal (muir "sea", gheal "bright") in Irish and Muireall in Scottish Gaelic. Various versions have long been evident in Breton, Irish, and Scottish Gaelic languages. The name was very common in medieval England, typically in the form of "Merial". Unusually for a name of Celtic origin, it remained common after the Norman Conquest, although rare from about 1300. 

Remaining common in Scotland as Muriel, the name in this form was introduced back into England in the mid-19th century, facilitated by Dinah Craik's 1856 novel John Halifax, Gentleman whose title character's daughter is named Muriel. Born in 1802, Muriel is said to be named "after the rather peculiar name of John's mother." 

The name Muriel was listed in the top 200 names from 1912 to 1933, with its highest rate of popularity in the 1920s. Since that time, use of the name has declined and is now rare.

List of persons with the given name
 Muriel Anderson (born 1960), American guitarist
 Muriel Angelus (1912–2004), British actress
Muriel Bamblett, advocate for Aboriginal child welfare in Victoria and Australia
 Muriel Barbery (born 1969), Moroccan-born French novelist
 Muriel Beaumont (1881–1957), British actress
 Muriel Bell (1898–1974), New Zealand nutritionist and researcher
 Muriel Bowser (born 1972), mayor of the District of Columbia
 Muriel Box (1905–1991), British screenwriter and film director 
 Muriel Brandolini, French-Vietnamese interior designer
Muriel Broadbent (Edith Hacon) (1875–1952), British socialite, suffragist, WWI women's hospital volunteer
 Muriel Brunskill (1899–1980), British contralto
 Muriel Casals i Couturier (1945–2016), French-born Catalan economist
Muriel Cooper (1925–1994), American artist and designer
 Muriel Davisson, American neuroscientist
 Muriel Day (born 1942), Irish singer
 Muriel Duckworth (1908–2009), Canadian activist
 Muriel Evans (1910–2000), American actress
 Muriel Fox (born 1928), American public relations executive and feminist activist 
 Muriel Forbes (1894–1991), British politician
 Muriel Gray (born 1958), Scottish author, broadcaster and journalist
 Muriel Gustavo Becker (born 1987), Brazilian male footballer
 Muriel Humphrey Brown, (1912–1998), American "second lady", political wife and activist; briefly, a U.S. Senator
 Muriel Kovitz (1926–2021), Chancellor Emeritus of the University of Calgary
 Muriel Miguel (born 1937), Native American theatre director and choreographer
 Muriel Millard (1922–2014), Canadian actress, dancer, painter, singer-songwriter
 Muriel Moody (1907–1991), New Zealand ceramic artist
 Muriel Nissel (1921–2010), British statistician and civil servant
 Lady Muriel Paget (1876–1938), English aristocrat, humanitarian, and relief organiser
 Muriel Pavlow (born 1921), British actress
 Muriel Robinson (born 1954), British academic administrator and education scholar
 Muriel Rukeyser (1913–1980), American poet and political activist
 Muriel Smith (1923–1985), American mezzo-soprano
 Muriel Spark (1918–2006), Scottish novelist
 Muriel the Poetess (11th century), poet at Wilton Abbey
Muriel Thomasset (born 1971), French physicist specializing in optics
Muriel Window (1892–1965), Ziegfeld Girl, pilot, restaurant owner

List of fictional characters with the given name
 Muriel (Animal Farm), a goat in George Orwell's novel Animal Farm
 Muriel, the main antagonist in the 2013 film Hansel & Gretel: Witch Hunters
 Muriel, hotel maid who was a recurring character in the family sitcom The Suite Life of Zack & Cody
Muriel, an angel, the youngest brother of angels Lucifer Morningstar and Uriel in the Fox TV series Lucifer
 Muriel Bagge, one of the main characters in Courage the Cowardly Dog
 Chandler Muriel Bing, one of the male lead roles in the US TV sitcom Friends (1994–2004)
Muriel P. Finster in the animated series Recess
 Muriel Glass in J. D. Salinger's short story "A Perfect Day for Bananafish"
 Muriel Hardwicke, the main antagonist of Eva Ibbotson's 1981 historical romance A Countess Below Stairs
 Muriel Heslop, lead character in the 1994 Australian film Muriel's Wedding
 Muriel McComber, teenage lead role in the Eugene O'Neill play Ah, Wilderness! (1933)
 Lady Muriel Orme, one of the main characters in Lewis Carroll's Sylvie and Bruno novels
 Muriel Pritchett, character in the Anne Tyler novel The Accidental Tourist (1985)
 Muriel Rush, female lead role in the sitcom Too Close for Comfort
 Muriel Stacy, Anne's teacher in Anne of Green Gables
 Muriel Taggert, the villain of the first Fablehaven book
 Muriel Prewett, great-aunt of Ron Weasley in Harry Potter and the Deathly Hallows (2009)
Muriel Alison Goldberg Schwartz, daughter of Erica Goldberg Schwartz and Geoffrey Schwartz in The Goldbergs (2022)

See also
List of Irish-language given names
Mariel (given name)

References

English-language feminine given names
English feminine given names
Irish feminine given names
Scottish feminine given names